The Pepacton Reservoir, also known as the Downsville Reservoir, is a reservoir in Delaware County, New York on the East Branch of the Delaware River in the Catskill Mountains of New York.  Part of the New York City water supply system, it was formed by the construction of Downsville Dam, and impounds over one-quarter of the East Branch's flow.

This makes it the city water system's largest reservoir by volume.

Pepacton Reservoir supplies New York City with nearly 25% of its drinking water. Its water empties into the  East Delaware Tunnel near the former site of Pepacton, then flows through the aqueduct into the Rondout Reservoir, which empties into the  Delaware Aqueduct. Flow is then routed under the Hudson into the West Branch Reservoir in Putnam County, New York, then on to the Kensico Reservoir in Westchester County just north of The Bronx.  From there the aqueduct continues on to Hillview Reservoir, from which it is distributed by tunnel to users in the City.

Peapackton is a Lenape Native American term meaning "marriage of the waters". The reservoir lies on land New York City purchased in the valley in 1942, and led to the displacement of 974 people, destruction of four towns (Arena, Pepacton, Shavertown and Union Grove), and submersion of nearly one-quarter of the Delaware and Northern Railroad in the process. The dam, located at Downsville, was finished in 1954, and the flooding was completed in 1955.

The reservoir is a significant factor in the local economy of Downsville, New York, as thousands of tourists travel to Downsville each year to fish for trout.  No motor boats are allowed on the reservoir.

Tributaries
 Mill Brook
 Barkaboom Stream
 Lower Beach Hill Brook
 Holliday Brook
 Bryden Hill Brook
 Murphy Hill Brook
 Flynn Brook
 Tremper Kill
 Bush Kill

See also
List of reservoirs and dams in New York

References

Delaware River
Catskill/Delaware watersheds
Reservoirs in New York (state)
Protected areas of Delaware County, New York
Reservoirs in Delaware County, New York